A high forest is a type of forest originated from seed or from planted seedlings.  In contrast to a low forest (also known as a coppice forest), a high forest usually consists of large, tall mature trees with a closed canopy. High forests can occur naturally or they can be created and maintained by human management.  Trees in a high forest can be of one, a few or many species.  A high forest can be even-aged or uneven-aged.   Even-aged forests contain trees of one, or two successional age classes (generations).  Uneven-aged forests have three or more age classes represented.

High forests have relatively high genetic diversity compared with coppice forests, which develop from vegetative reproduction. A high forest can have one or more canopy layers. The understory of a high forest can be open (parklike, easy to see and walk through), or it can be dense. A high forest's understory can have high or low vegetation species diversity.

See also

Coppicing
Ecological thinning
Old-growth forest
Pollarding
Silviculture

References

Forest ecology
Trees
Habitat management equipment and methods